Nils Rudolph  (born 18 August 1965 in Rostock, Mecklenburg-Vorpommern) is a former butterfly and freestyle swimmer from Germany, who competed for his native country at the  1992 Summer Olympics in Barcelona, Spain. He is best known for winning the gold medal in the men's 50 m freestyle at the 1991 European LC Championships in Athens, Greece.

References
 sports-reference

1965 births
Living people
German male swimmers
Olympic swimmers of Germany
German male butterfly swimmers
German male freestyle swimmers
Swimmers at the 1992 Summer Olympics
Sportspeople from Rostock
European Aquatics Championships medalists in swimming
20th-century German people
21st-century German people